BLI may refer to:

Biology
 Bio-layer interferometry, a real-time technique to study biomolecular interactions
 Bioluminescence imaging, a technology that allows for the noninvasive study of small laboratory animals

Organizations
 Bible Lessons International, an American Bible study ministry
 BirdLife International, the international conservation organization working to protect the world's birds and their habitats

Other
 Bellingham International Airport, a public airport located three miles (5 km) northwest of Bellingham, Whatcom County, Washington
 OECD Better Life Index, an interactive tool that allows people to compare countries' performances according to their own preferences
 BackLog Item, an item in the backlog in Scrum (software development)